A revolution or revolt is an attempt to fundamentally change an organizational structure in a relatively short period of time.

The adjective revolting can refer either to revolution as above, or to disgust.

Revolt or Revolting may also refer to:

Film and television 
 Revolt (film), a 2017 American science-fiction film starring Lee Pace
 Revolt (TV network), an American cable television network, by Sean Combs
 Revolting (TV series), a 2017 British comedy series

Music 
 Revolt (3 Colours Red album), 1999
 Revolt (The Dreams album), 2010, and the title song
 Revolt (Wild Fire album), 2017, and the title song
 "Revolt" (song), a 2015 song by Muse

Other uses 
 The Revolt, a 1951 history book
 Re-Volt, a 1999 video game by Acclaim Entertainment

See also
 
 Rebellion
 Riot